Cyrtopogon ruficornis is a species of fly in the robber flies family. It is found in parts of Central and Southern Europe.

Distribution
This species occurs in Austria, Bulgaria, Croatia, Czech Republic, France, Germany, Italy, Poland, Romania, Slovakia, Switzerland, and former Yugoslavia.

Description
In the antennae of these robber flies the postpedicels are red. Tergites 2-4 are nearly completely covered with densely arranged yellow hairs. Tibiae are at least in part red. In males tarsi of front legs are distinctly elongated.

In the male's genitalia epandrium is partially divided, apically rounded, sclerotized and covered with long hairs, while hypandrium shows at the apex two projections. Also the flattened dististylus is apically pointed. Aedeagus is tubular with two straight, pointed projections. In the female's genitalia the ovipositor is sclerotized, with six acanthophorites on each side.

Biology
Adults can be found from April to August. This species has a complex courtship. Usually the males dance in front of the females showing the shining black tip of the abdomen and raising his body on middle and hind legs. As other robber flies, they are predators on other insects.

References

External links
 Natura mediterraneo
 Galerie-insecte
 Diptera.info

Asilidae
Asilomorph flies of Europe